Deimos-2 is a Spanish remote sensing Earth observation satellite built for Elecnor Deimos under an agreement with Satrec Initiative, a satellite manufacturing company in South Korea.

The Earth observation system was developed by Elecnor Deimos, who managed the engineering, ground segment, integration, tests, launch contract and LEOP, in collaboration with Satrec Initiative, who provided the platform and the payload. The platform is based on DubaiSat-2 launched in 2013, with a larger battery pack intended to last for at least 7 years. The satellite was purchased by Urthecast in 2015, together with Deimos-1 and Deimos Imaging, the division of Elecnor Deimos that was in charge of the operation of both satellites.

Deimos-2 was owned by Deimos Imaging, who operated iand commercialises its data. In 2021, the company GEOSAT acquired Deimos-1 & 2, and renamed them to GEOSAT-1 & 2, respectively.

See also

 2014 in spaceflight

References

External links
 GEOSAT-2/Deimos-2 Imagery User's Guide

Spacecraft launched in 2014
Satellites of South Korea
Satellites of Spain
Earth imaging satellites
Spacecraft launched by Dnepr rockets